Kohiwala is a village in Khanewal district of Punjab, Pakistan approximately 10 km from Kabirwala.

AliAhmad also lived here
In 6 kassi Aray wala 
Belongs to Manj Rajput Family 

The majority of population is Muslim. The surrounding areas are 6-kassiArayWala, Basti Lakkan Wali Achalwala, Mitheywala''......'Kot Wala, Harrajjaan Wala, 9-Lakhiwala,
Naibeywala, and Shahpur Nathuwala are also considered included within the premises of kohiwala. The majority of the population of the surrounding area is Rajput, Arain, Gujjar, Jat, Kamboj, Awan, Naich, Mirali, Sahu, Dhudhi, Bhatti, Khokhar and Sial, Maachi, Harrajj tribes)

There Higher Secondary School for Girls & High School for boys & two primary schools.8 private schools are also found there.
There are two saints (Sufis) shrines in this town . 1.Baba Noor Sheed 2nd one is Hafiz baba Abdul Majeed Nakshbandi. Every year on 23 March, Sang (Mela of Baba Noor Shaheed held for 1 day.
The principal crops of this area are wheat, cotton, rice, corn, sugar cane and peppers, as well as mango and orange. It is rapidly growing business center for surrounding villages.
There are two large public playgrounds.
This Village is also well known in field hockey, Every year big hockey tournament organised where all over Pakistan hockey clubs teams take participants.
Moreover many of hockey players of this village played at National and International level.

There is also a branch of Habib Bank Limited the largest banking network of Pakistan providing real time online services in this village. HBL Automated teller machine (ATM) also available . There is also an office of Pakistan Post.
The transport companies (Almakkah president & two others) are also from kohiwala.
Two running petrol pumps are also there.
Several mosques are also built in Kohiwala including Markazri Jamia Masjid  & Faizan-e-Madina the madani markaz of Dawat-e-Islami.
Member of National Assembly was Raza Hayat Hiraj, and Member of Province Assembly was Hussain Jahanian Gardezi. from 2008 to 2018

References

Populated places in Khanewal District